Naiktha Bains and Tereza Mihalíková were the defending champions but Mihalíková chose not to participate. Bains played alongside Mihaela Buzărnescu, but lost in the first round to Han Na-lae and Jang Su-jeong.

Han and Jang went on to win the title, defeating Yuki Naito and Moyuka Uchijima in the final, 3–6, 6–2, [10–5].

Seeds

Draw

Draw

References
Main Draw

ACT Clay Court International 1 - Doubles